Vodice pri Gabrovki is a settlement north of Gabrovka in the Municipality of Litija in central Slovenia. The area is part of the traditional region of Lower Carniola and is now included with the rest of the municipality in the Central Sava Statistical Region. The settlement includes the hamlets of Zgornje Vodice, Spodnje Vodice, and Greben.

Name
The name of the settlement was changed from Vodice to Vodice pri Gabrovki in 1953. In the past the German name was Woditz.

Church
The local church is dedicated to Saint Agnes and belongs to the Parish of Gabrovka. It dates to the late 15th century.

References

External links
Vodice pri Gabrovki on Geopedia

Populated places in the Municipality of Litija